Vancouver was a federal electoral district in British Columbia, Canada,  that was represented in the House of Commons of Canada from 1872 to 1904. This riding was created for the 1872 federal election, following British Columbia's admission into the Canadian Confederation in 1871, and lasted until 1903.

The name of this riding is not derived from the contemporary City of Vancouver, B.C., but from its first incarnation in 1871 as the riding representing Vancouver Island (excepting the Victoria-area ridings).  The Vancouver area was part of the New Westminster electoral district at the time of the province joining Confederation.

Members of Parliament

Election results

See also 

 List of Canadian federal electoral districts
 Past Canadian electoral districts

External links 

 Website of the Parliament of Canada
Riding history from the Library of Parliament

Defunct British Columbia federal electoral districts on Vancouver Island